The Catholic Benevolent Legion was a Roman Catholic benevolent society providing life insurance founded in New York in 1881. A parallel Catholic Women's Benevolent Legion was founded in 1895. The Legion merged with the Knights of Columbus in 1969.

References 

Life insurance
Knights of Columbus
Organizations established in 1881
Organizations disestablished in 1969
1881 establishments in New York (state)